Gianpaolo Dozzo (Quinto di Treviso, 2 October 1954) is a Venetist politician and leading member of the Liga Veneta–Lega Nord.

Dozzo joined Liga Veneta in 1982, seven years before the foundation of Lega Nord, and was first elected to the Chamber of Deputies in 1994.  He was then re-elected in 1996, 2001, 2006 and 2008, being one of the League's longest-serving MPs. Between 2001 and 2006 Dozzo was under-secretary of Agriculture in Berlusconi II and III Cabinets. In January 2012 Dozzo was appointed floor leader of the party in the Chamber, the first Venetian in that role. He did not stand for re-election in 2013.

References

1954 births
Living people
Politicians of Veneto
Venetist politicians
People from the Province of Treviso
Lega Nord politicians
Members of the Chamber of Deputies (Italy)
20th-century Italian politicians
21st-century Italian politicians